Francis Kora is a New Zealand musician and actor. He currently performs with the groups Kora and the Modern Māori Quartet. He co-wrote and performed songs, with the other band members, for the Modern Māori Quartet's debut album That's Us! (2017).

Kora starred in the 2014 film The Pā Boys. He co-hosts Māori Television's My Party Song as part of the Modern Māori Quartet. In 2018 Kora, alongside other members of Modern Māori Quartet, began touring their cabaret show Modern Māori Quartet: Two Worlds.

Early life 
Kora was born in Whakatane, New Zealand and is of Māori (Ngāi Tūhoe, Ngāti Pūkeko) descent. Francis and his three brothers Laughton, Stuart and Brad grew up entertaining. As kids they played RSAs, rugby clubs and Cossie clubs in Whakatane, under the guidance of their Father. Francis is a graduate of Toi Whakaari: New Zealand Drama School (Te Kura Toi Whakaari ō Aotearoa) earning a Bachelor of Performing Arts (Acting) in 2003 .

Career

Music 

In the 1990s Kora and his three brothers, Laughton, Brad and Stuart, founded the band, Kora. He is a member of the Māori showband the Modern Māori Quartet, alongside Maaka Pohatu, Matariki Whatarau and James Tito.

Film and television 

Kora made his debut feature film appearance as a lead actor in The Pā Boys in 2014.

Theatre 

In 2018 Francis, along with other members of Modern Māori Quartet, began touring their cabaret show Modern Māori Quartet: Two Worlds.

Personal life 
Kora has a young daughter, Coco-Grace and a young son Akira Tait Kora. He wrote the Modern Māori Quartet's song "Shine" for her, and dedicated it to "all the kids in the world".

Discography

 Happy Hour (2014)
 That's Us! (2017)

References 

Year of birth missing (living people)
Living people
New Zealand male Māori actors
New Zealand male film actors
People from Whakatāne
21st-century guitarists
21st-century New Zealand male singers
New Zealand male singer-songwriters
Toi Whakaari alumni
New Zealand male television actors
21st-century New Zealand male actors
New Zealand bass guitarists
New Zealand Māori male singers
Ngāi Tūhoe people 
Ngāti Awa people